Willi Oberbeck (21 February 1910 – 1979) was a German professional road bicycle racer. In 1938, Oberbeck won the first stage of the Tour de France, and was therefore leading the general classification for one day. He was born in Hagen.

Major results

1938
4th stage Tour of Germany
Tour de France:
Winner stage 1
Leading general classification for one day

References

External links

1910 births
1979 deaths
Sportspeople from Hagen
German male cyclists
German Tour de France stage winners
Cyclists from North Rhine-Westphalia